Marta Ingarden (born Marta Bińkowska 8 September 1921, Lviv - 18 January 2009, Krakow) was a Polish and Ukrainian architect and engineer.

Early life 
Ingarden was born on 8 September 1921 in Lviv. She graduated from the Queen Jadwiga Gymnasium and Secondary School in Lviv in 1939. She began her studies at the Faculty of Architecture at the Lviv Polytechnic, which she was able to continue during the Nazi occupation of Poland from September 1939. 

In 1945, Ingarden began her studies at the Faculty of Architecture at the Politechniki Krakowskiej, which she completed in 1948.

Career 
Following graduation, she took up a job as a designer in the Construction Office of the Coal Industry in Krakow, then in the Directorate of Workers' Housing Estates, and from 1 January 1950 in the Central Office of Projects and Studies of Housing Estates ZOR for the city of Nowa Huta.

Together with her husband Janusz Ingarden, Ingarden designed and supervised the construction of many buildings in Nowa Huta. Among them the Chamber Theatre, (for the unrealised Nowa Huta Theatre), and buildings S and Z of the Lenin Steelworks Administration Centre. 

In 1957, alongside her husband Janusz, Ingarden received the second degree award for the design of the "experimental building" in the B-32 housing estate, now the Szklane Domy housing estate. Her projects include Nowa Huta, Ludowy Theatre, and Osiedle Szklane Domy/

Personal life 
Marta Ingarden died on 18 January 2009 in Kraków and her funeral took place on 24 January 2009 at the Salwator Cemetery.

Gallery

References 

1921 births
2009 deaths
Architects from Lviv
Women engineers
20th-century women engineers
Engineers from Lviv
Polish women architects
Burials at Salwator Cemetery
Tadeusz Kościuszko University of Technology alumni
Architects from Kraków
Ukrainian women architects